Elena Pampulova (also Elena Pampulova-Wagner, Elena Pampulova-Bergomi, born 17 May 1972) is a retired tennis player from Bulgaria. She has won one singles and three WTA doubles titles.

Her professional tennis career span from 1988 to 2001. Pampulova's career-high singles ranking is world No. 62, her career-high doubles ranking is No. 38, both achieved in September 1996.

Tennis career
Pampoulova played for Bulgaria and the Bulgaria Fed Cup team from 1988 to 1992. Pampulova was one of only three players to represent Bulgaria in tennis at the 1992 Olympics in Barcelona (together with Katerina Maleeva and Magdalena Maleeva).

From 1997 to 1999, Elena played for the Germany Fed Cup team. She won 13 career titles in singles (one WTA) and 11 titles in doubles (three of them from WTA Tour).

Her first tennis coach was her own mother, Bulgarian tennis player Lubka Radkova. Elena's father, Emilian Pampoulov, is also a tennis player.

Personal life
On 11 July 2006, Pampoulova married her long-time boyfriend, Swiss banker Christian Bergomi. Their son Alex was born in early 2008. The couple lives in Switzerland, where Elena is an asset manager. In June 2022 she was found guilty of money laundering offences together with Credit Suisse and three other defendants. Prior to the trial, Credit Suisse unreservedly rejected as meritless all allegations raised against her and [was] convinced that she [was] innocent. Both the bank and Elena Pampoulova have announced their intentions to appeal the court decision.

WTA career finals

Singles: 2 (1 title, 1 runner–up)

Doubles: 8 (3 titles, 5 runner-ups)

ITF Circuit finals

Singles: 14 (12 titles, 2 runner–ups)

Doubles: 13 (8 titles, 5 runner–ups)

Fed Cup
Elena Pampoulova debuted for the Bulgaria Fed Cup team in 1988. She has a 5–6 singles record and a 3–2 doubles record (8–8 overall).

Singles (5–6)

Doubles (3–2)

Grand Slam singles performance timeline

Notes

External links
 
 
 
Bulgarian Olympic Committee

1972 births
Living people
Bulgarian expatriate sportspeople in Switzerland
Bulgarian female tennis players
German expatriate sportspeople in Switzerland
German female tennis players
German people of Bulgarian descent
Olympic tennis players of Bulgaria
Sportspeople from Sofia
Tennis players at the 1992 Summer Olympics